The following notable people were born in, residents of, or otherwise closely associated with the city of Tehran, Iran. Tehran natives are also referred to as Tehranis.

Born in Tehran

1801–1900 
 Bahá'u'lláh (1817–1892), founder of the Bahá'í faith
 Subh-i-Azal (1831–1912), Persian religious leader of Azali Bábism
 `Abdu'l-Bahá (1844–1921), founder of the Bahá'í faith
 Morteza Gholi Khan Hedayat (1856–1911), politician and first chairman of the Iranian parliament
 Mirza Ali Asghar Khan Amin al-Soltan (1858–1907), Prime Minister of Iran
 Mehdi Qoli Hedayat (1863–1955), Prime Minister of Iran
 Vossug ed Dowleh (1868–1951), Prime Minister of Qajar era Iran
 Mostowfi ol-Mamalek ( 1871–1932), politician; Prime Minister on six occasions from 1910 to 1927
 Ali-Akbar Dehkhoda (1879–1956), linguist
 Hossein Ala' (1881–1964), Prime Minister of Iran in 1951 and from 1955 to 1957
 Abol-Ghasem Kashani (1882–1962), Twelver Shia Muslim cleric and Chairman of the Parliament of Iran
 Mohammad Mosaddegh (1882–1967), politician
 Ali Mansur (1886–1974), Prime Minister of Iran
 Harold Nicolson (1886–1968), English diplomat, author, diarist and politician
 Solayman Haïm (1887–1970), lexicographer, translator, playwright and essayist
 Mirza Javad Khan Ameri (1891–1980), Iranian politician
 Saeed Nafisi (1895–1966), scholar, fiction writer and poet
 Ahmad Matin-Daftari (1896–1971), Prime Minister of Iran
 Gholamreza Rouhani (1897–1985), humorous poet
 Nasrollah Entezam (1900–1980), diplomat
 Mohammad Hejazi (1900–1974), novelist, short-story writer, playwright, essayist, translator

1901–1930 
 Haj Ali Razmara (1901–1951), military leader and prime minister of Iran
 Sadegh Hedayat (1903–1951), writer, translator and intellectual
 Bozorg Alavi (1904–1997), writer, novelist, and political intellectual
 Ali Amini (1905–1992), politician and writer, Prime Minister of Iran from 1961 to 1962
 Rahi Mo'ayyeri (1909–1968), poet and musician
 Davud Monshizadeh (1915–1989), founder of Sumka (the "Iranian National Socialist Workers Party")
 Shams Pahlavi (1917–1996), the elder sister of Mohammad Reza Pahlavi, the last Shah of Iran
 Amir-Abbas Hoveyda (1919–1979), economist and politician
 Mohammad Reza Pahlavi (1919–1980), king of Iran (Shah of Iran) from 1941 until his overthrow by the Islamic Revolution (1979)
 Nasser Moghadam (1921–1979), the fourth and last chief of SAVAK
 Heydar Ghiai (born 1922), architect
 Jalal Al-e-Ahmad (1923–1969), writer, thinker and social and political critic
 Hassan Ali Mansur (1923–1965), politician, Prime Minister from 1963 to 1965
 Abdollah Mojtabavi (1925–2012), freestyle wrestling athlete
 Sadegh Nezam-mafi (1925–2009), physician and medical pioneer
 Ali Javan (born 1926), Iranian-American physicist and inventor at MIT
 Simin Behbahani (1927–2014), poet, lyricist and activist
 Ray Aghayan (1928–2011), costume designer
 Masoud Boroumand (1928–2011), footballer
 Ardeshir Zahedi (born 1928), diplomat
 Lotfi Mansouri (1929–2013), opera director and manager
 Ali Mirzaei (born 1929), weightlifter
 Mahmoud Mollaghasemi (born 1929), freestyle wrestler
 Ezzatollah Sahabi (1930–2011), scholar, humanitarian, democracy activist, politician and former Parliament member
 Gholamreza Takhti (1930–1968), Olympic gold medalist wrestler

1931–1950 
 Mohammad Ali Fardin (1931–2000), wrestler and actor
 Mostafa Chamran (1932–1981), physicist, politician and commander
 Nasser Givehchi (born 1932), wrestler
 Hossein Nasr (born 1933), University Professor of Islamic studies at George Washington University and Islamic philosopher
 Forough Farrokhzad (1935–1967), poet and film director
 Iraj Ghaderi (1935–2012), film director and actor
 Bahman Nirumand (born 1936), Iranian and German journalist and author
 Kamran Diba (born 1937), architect
 Majid Samii (born 1937), neurosurgeon and medical scientist
 Hossein Zenderoudi (born 1937), painter and sculptor
 Parviz Jalayer (born 1939), weightlifter and Olympic silver medalist
 Dariush Mehrjui (born 1939), director, screenwriter, producer, film editor
 Younan Nowzaradan (born 1944), surgeon and TV personality
 Kamran Shirdel (born 1939), documentarist
 Bijan (1940–2011), designer of menswear and fragrances
 Abbas Kiarostami (born 1940), film director, screenwriter, photographer and film producer
 Shahnaz Pahlavi (born 1940), Princess of Iran
 Barbet Schroeder (born 1941), film director and producer
 Khosrow Vaziri (born 1942), professional wrestler and actor
 Ali Hatami (1944–1996), film director, screenwriter, art director and costume designer
 Kamal Kharazi (born 1944), politician and diplomat
 Sohrab Shahid-Saless (1944–1998), film director and screenwriter
 Gholam-Ali Haddad-Adel (born 1945), philosopher and politician
 Mohammad Nassiri (born 1945), weightlifter and Olympic gold medalist
 Abdolkarim Soroush (born 1945), thinker and reformer
 Ali Parvin (born 1946), football player and coach
 Shahrnush Parsipur (born 1946), novelist
 Mohammad Reza Adelkhani (born 1947), footballer
 Mansour Barzegar (born 1947), wrestler
 Shaul Mofaz (born 1948), Israeli politician
 Firouzeh Vokhshouri (born 1948), Princess Firouzeh Asem of Jordan
 Ebi (born 1949), singer
 Nasser Hejazi (1949–2011), football player and coach
 Googoosh (born 1950), Iranian singer and actress of Iranian Azerbaijani origin
 Hassan Mehmani (born 1950), Iranian actor and director

1951–1960 
 Andranik Eskandarian (born 1951), Iranian-American footballer
 Mansoor Hekmat (1951–2002), Marxist theorist and leader of the worker-communist movement
 Shohreh Aghdashloo (born 1952), Iranian-American actress
 Seyed Mostafa Azmayesh (born 1952), France based Iranian religious scholar
 Parviz Davoodi (born 1952), hardline conservative politician
 Valentine Moghadam (born 1952), feminist scholar, sociologist, activist and author
 Maryam Rajavi (born 1953), politician
 Mary Apick (born 1954), Iranian-Armenian stage, television and film actress
 Hadi Teherani (born 1954), German-Iranian architect and designer
 Darius Khondji (born 1955), Iranian-French cinematographer
 Azar Nafisi (born 1955), writer and professor of English literature
 Feizollah Nasseri (born 1955), weightlifter
 Goli Ameri (born 1956), Iranian-American diplomat and businesswoman
 Ramin Jahanbegloo (born 1956), philosopher and academic
 Mostafa Mohammad-Najjar (born 1956), politician and army general
 Mohsen Makhmalbaf (born 1957), film director, writer, film editor and producer
 Abbas Maroufi (born 1957), novelist and journalist
 Andranik Madadian (born 1958), Armenian-Iranian singer-songwriter and actor
 Bita Farrahi (born 1958), actress
 Farzad Bonyadi (born  1959), professional poker player
 Majid Majidi (born 1959), film director, film producer and screenwriter
 Ahmad Bourghani (1960–2008), politician, journalist, writer and political analyst
 Masoumeh Ebtekar (born 1960), Vice President of Iran for Women and Family Affairs
 Vali Nasr (born 1960), American academic and author
 Reza Pahlavi (born 1960), crown prince of Persia
 Cumrun Vafa (born 1960), Iranian-American leading string theorist from Harvard University

1961–1970 
 Parastou Forouhar (born 1962), installation artist
 Rita (born 1962), Israeli pop singer and actress
 Camila Batmanghelidjh (born ), Iranian-born author and charity executive in the United Kingdom
 Amir Ghalenoei (born 1963), football coach and player
 Farahnaz Pahlavi (born 1963), the eldest daughter of Mohammad Reza Pahlavi
 Shaun Toub (born 1963), film and television actor
 Philippe Blasband (born 1964), filmmaker; writer in French language from Belgium
 Rosie Malek-Yonan (born 1965), actress, author, director and activist of Assyrian ethnicity
 Marina Nemat (born 1965), author
 Afshin Ellian (born 1966), Iranian-Dutch professor of law, philosopher, poet and critic of political Islam
 Reza Mirkarimi (born 1966), film writer and director
 Maryam Namazie (born 1966), secularist and human rights activist, commentator and broadcaster
 Ali-Reza Pahlavi (1966–2011), member of the Pahlavi Imperial Family of Iran (Persia)
 Jasmin Tabatabai (born 1967), Iranian-German actress
 Mani Haghighi (born 1969), filmmaker, screenwriter and actor
 Abbas Jadidi (born 1969), wrestler
 Azam Ali (born 1970), Iranian American singer and musician
 Amir Ansari (born 1970), Chief Technology Officer and co-founder of Prodea Systems
 Shokufeh Kavani (born 1970), contemporary painter, translator and artist
 Leila Pahlavi (1970–2001), youngest daughter of Mohammad Reza Pahlavi, Shah of Iran
 Sharam (born 1970), Iranian-American progressive house DJ and producer

1971–1980 
 Arash Hejazi (born 1971), novelist, fiction writer and translator of literary works from English and Portuguese into Persian
 Niki Karimi (born 1971), actress, director and screenwriter
 Mansour (born 1971), Iranian Azerbaijani artist
 Alireza Mansourian (born 1971), football coach and player
 Leila Hatami (born 1972), actress
 Tami Stronach (born 1972), Israeli American dancer and choreographer
 Shadmehr Aghili (born 1973), pop singer, musician, composer, producer and songwriter
 Ali Tabatabaee (born 1973), rapper, singer, musician in band Zebrahead
 Cassandra Clare (born 1973), American author of young adult fiction
 Kirill Pirogov (born 1973), Russian film and theatre actor and composer
 DJ Aligator (born 1975), Iranian-Danish producer and DJ
 Omid Nouripour (born 1975), Iranian-German politician
 Bahar Soomekh (born 1975), Iranian-American actress
 Vahid Hashemian (born 1976), footballer and coach
 Roxana Manouchehri (born 1976), visual artist
 Mahnaz Afshar (born 1977), actress
 Arash (born 1977), Iranian-Swedish singer, entertainer and producer
 Mehdi Mahdavikia (born 1977), football player
 Marsha Mehran (1977–2014), novelist
 Maryam Mirzakhani (born 1977), mathematician
 Laleh Seddigh (born 1977), female race car driver
 Ameneh Bahrami (born 1978), woman blinded in an acid attack
 Antonio Esfandiari (born 1978), professional poker player
 Ramin Karimloo (born 1978), Iranian-Canadian actor and singer
 Navíd Akhavan (born 1980), Iranian-German actor
 Nazanin Boniadi (born 1980), Iranian-born British American actress
 Samira Makhmalbaf (born 1980), filmmaker and script writer
 Sami Yusuf (born 1980), British singer-songwriter, composer and producer of Iranian Azerbaijani descent

1981–2000 
 Nasim Pedrad (born 1981), Iranian-American actress and comedian
 Amir Hossein Sadeghi (born 1981), football player
 Sirvan Khosravi (born 1982), pop singer and composer
 Amir Shapourzadeh (born 1982), Iranian-German footballer
 Vahid Talebloo (born 1982), football goalkeeper
 Andranik Teymourian (born 1983), footballer
 Elshan Moradi (born 1985), chess grandmaster
 Gegard Mousasi (born 1985), Dutch mixed martial artist
 Behrang Safari (born 1985), Iranian-Swedish footballer
 Fatemeh Behboudi (born 1985), photojournalist
 Ashkan Dejagah (born 1986), professional footballer
 Mohammad Bagheri Motamed (born 1986), taekwondo practitioner
 Omid Abolhassani (born 1988), football player banned for four years
 Alireza Haghighi (born 1988), goalkeeper
 Marjan Kalhor (born 1988), alpine skier
 Hana Makhmalbaf (born 1988), filmmaker
 Mohammad Parvin (born 1988), football player
 Atousa Pourkashiyan (born 1988), chess player
 Mohammad Kiadarbandsari (born 1989), alpine skier
 Milad Mohammadi (born 1993), footballer
 Dalita Avanesian (born 1999), Armenian singer, participant in Junior Eurovision Song Contest 2011

Full date unknown 
 Omid Habibinia, journalist and organization founder

Lived in Tehran 
 Naser al-Din Shah Qajar (1831–1896), King of Persia from 1848 to 1896
 Shirin Ebadi (born 1947), lawyer
 Majid Entezami (born 1948), musician and composer
 Kayhan Kalhor (born 1963), Kamancheh player, composer and master of classical Kurdish and Iranian traditional music
 Hadi Saei (born 1976), taekwondo athlete

References 

 
Tehran
Tehran
People